The name Omais has been used to name four tropical cyclones in the northwestern Pacific Ocean. The name was contributed by the United States of America, and is a Palauan word for "wandering around".

 Severe Tropical Storm Omais (2004) (T0403, 06W, Enteng) - a weak storm that formed in May of 2004.
 Tropical Storm Omais (2010) (T1001, 02W, Agaton) - recurved out to sea as a tropical storm
 Severe Tropical Storm Omais (2016) (T1605, 07W) - recurved out to sea, later threatening Alaska as an extratropical cyclone 
 Tropical Storm Omais (2021) (T2112, 16W, Isang) - A long-lived tropical cyclone which affected South Korea and the Mariana Islands.

Pacific typhoon set index articles